Sir Harry Dent Goring, 8th baronet (30 December 1801 – 19 April 1859), was an English politician.

He was a Member (MP) for New Shoreham in 1832.

References

1801 births
1859 deaths
Baronets in the Baronetage of England
Members of the Parliament of the United Kingdom for English constituencies
Viscounts in the Jacobite peerage
UK MPs 1832–1835
UK MPs 1835–1837
UK MPs 1837–1841